Korean Hostel in Spain  is a South Korean variety show by tvN starring Cha Seung-won, Yoo Hae-jin and . The cast run an albergue, a hostel specially catered to travellers hiking an 800km pilgrimage known as the Camino de Santiago. The albergue is located in Villafranca del Bierzo, Spain, 187km away from the pilgrims' destination of Santiago de Compostela. For 9 days, the cast provided passing travellers a comfortable resting space and warm Korean meals, targeted especially for Korean pilgrims who miss the taste of home while on the long journey. The show aired on Fridays at 19:10 (KST) from March 15 to May 24, 2019.

The show reunited Cha Seung-won and Yoo Hae-jin with producer Na Young-seok over 3 years after their last variety show together, Three Meals a Day: Fishing Village 2.

Cast 
Cha Seung-won — main chef who prepares meals for the travellers and the cast
Yoo Hae-jin — hostel manager in charge of reception and cleaning, who also handcrafts a variety of furniture for the hostel
 — kitchen assistant who helps with food preparation and serving, groceries and miscellaneous tasks like making coffee

Ratings

References

External links 
 Official Website 
 tvN Asia Official Website

South Korean variety television shows
South Korean television shows
2019 South Korean television series debuts
TVN (South Korean TV channel) original programming
Korean-language television shows
2019 South Korean television series endings